Clockwork refers to devices powered by the energy of a wound spring released through a series of gears.

Clockwork or clock work may also refer to:

People
 RL Grime, or Clockwork, American electronic artist

Arts, entertainment, and media

Music

Albums
 Clockwork (Angelus Apatrida album)
 Clockwork (Phrase album), 2009

Songs
 "Clockwork" (Easton Corbin song), 2014
 "Clockwork" (deadmau5 song), 2008
 "Clockwork" (Ashley Roberts song), 2014
 "Clockwork" (Juelz Santana song), 2006
 "Clockwork", by Chelsea Grin from their 2014 album Ashes to Ashes
 "Clockwork", by Future User from their 2015 album SteroidsOrHeroin
 "Clockworks", by Meshuggah from their 2016 album The Violent Sleep of Reason
 "Clockwork", by Northlane from their 2022 album Obsidian
 "Clockwork Vaudeville", by Steam Powered Giraffe from their 2009 album Album One
 "Clockwork", by Structures from their 2011 album Divided By
 "Clockwork", by Within the Ruins from their 2014 album Phenomena

Other uses in arts, entertainment, and media
 Clockwerk, the main antagonist in the video game Sly Cooper
 Clockwork (film), a 1978 horror film directed by Sam Raimi
 Clockwork (novel), a 1996 children's book by Philip Pullman
 Clockwork (Danny Phantom), the Ghost Master of Time in the television show Danny Phantom
 "Clockwork", an episode of the television series Teletubbies
 Clockwork (video game), 2016 video game from Gamesoft
 Clock Works, Japanese port of ClockWerx

Other uses
 Clockwork universe theory

See also
 A Clockwork Orange (disambiguation)
 C-ROCK WORK (pronounced "clockwork"), an album by Zelda
 Clockwise (disambiguation)
 Klocwork, a software company which produces Klocwork, a static code analysis tool